Volharding Olympia Combinatie (VOC) is a cricket and association football club from Rotterdam, Netherlands. Its home ground is Sportpark Hazelaarweg in Hillegersberg-Schiebroek.

History 
VOC was formed on 1 January 1904 as a merger of RC & VV Volharding (1 January 1895) and RV & CV Olympia (23 May 1885). The foundation date of Volharding is maintained as the official establishment date. In 1905 and 1907 VOC football won the national cup.

The male first squad football promoted in 2019 to the Hoofdklasse, after winning a championship in the Eerste Klasse.

Former players 
 Anton Bakker
 Anton Hörburger
 Arnold Hörburger
 Geert den Ouden
 Dirk van Prooye
 Jan van der Sluis
 Thomas Verhaar
 Martijn de Vries
 Wally van Weelde

References 

Football clubs in the Netherlands
1904 establishments in the Netherlands
Football clubs in Rotterdam
Cricket teams in the Netherlands
Sports clubs in South Holland
Association football clubs established in 1904